Rasmus Bjerg (born 28 July 1976) is a Danish actor, comedian and singer.

He has enjoyed much success alongside Jonas Schmidt, in series like P.I.S. - Politiets Indsats Styrke, Wulffmorgenthaler, Dolph & Wulff and Jul i Verdensrummet.

He is mostly recognized in the comedy genre, but has also been seen in other genres. Rasmus Bjerg has also been featured in several commercials, such as Tuborg commercials and Lalandia commercials.

Filmography

Film

Møgunger (2003) .... Betjent Halding
Princess (2006)
Til døden os skiller (2007) .... Alf
Frode og alle de andre rødder (2008) .... Vicevært
Flame & Citron (2008) .... Smalle
Rejsen Til Saturn (2008) .... Agent 2 (voice)
Wall-E (2008) .... The Captain (Danish voice-over)
Max Pinlig (2008) .... Carlo
Oldboys (2009) .... Henrik B
Parterapi (2010) .... Bo
Nothing's All Bad (2010) .... Pornoshopindehaver
Med lukkede øjne (2010) .... Michael
All for One (2011) .... Timo
Sover Dolly på ryggen? (2012) .... Laus
Alle for to (2013) .... Timo
Player (2013) .... Michael Helge
Gentlemen (2014) .... Errol
All Inclusive (2014) .... Henrik
Iqbal & den hemmelige opskrift (2015) .... Æselmand
Den magiske juleæske (2016) .... Krampus (voice)
Iqbal & superchippen (2016) .... Æselmand
Alle for tre (2017) .... Timo
Sikke et cirkus: Det mystiske mysterium (2017) .... Cirkusdirektør Kaj
Jeg er William (2017) .... Morbror Nils
The Way to Mandalay (2018) .... John Mogensen
A Fortunate Man (2018) .... Eybert
Danmarks sønner (2019) .... Martin Nordahl
Ser du månen, Daniel (2019) .... Tue Berg
Gooseboy (2019) .... Togkontrollør
Kollision (2019) .... Svendsen

Television
P.I.S. - Politiets Indsats Styrke (2000–2001) .... Sebastian Dvorski
Hotellet (2002) .... hotel guest
Nikolaj og Julie (2003) .... akvariemand
Ørnen: En krimi-odyssé (2004) .... John Holm Hasselbjerg
Wulffmorgenthaler (2005) .... Loke / Bimmer / Sergeant Tolstrup / Leif "Kegle" Frandsen / John Ege / Munk Opani
Dolph & Wulff (2005) .... Torben Asmussen / Mogens den næsvise kattekilling / Bimmer / Ronald / Lydmanden Rico / Vincent Albøl Andersen
DR Julestuen (2005) .... Lågeåbneren Bruno
Familien Teddy (2006) .... Mama Teddy (uncredited)
Dolph & Wulff med venner (2006) .... Claus Halbæk / Kresten Bindesløv / Bimmer
MGP - De unges Melodi Grand Prix (2006) .... Bruno
Jul i Verdensrummet (2006) .... Klaus Ricardo
Trio Van Gogh (2007)
Hold Masken (2007) .... Himself
Mr. Poxycat (2007) .... Jørgen Thomsen aka Mr. Poxycat

External links

1976 births
Living people
Danish male film actors
Danish male television actors
21st-century Danish male actors